The Constitutional reforms of Augustus were a series of laws that were enacted by the Roman Emperor Augustus between 30 BC and 2 BC, which transformed the Constitution of the Roman Republic into the Constitution of the Roman Empire. The era during which these changes were made began when Augustus defeated Mark Antony and Cleopatra at the Battle of Actium in 31 BC, and ended when the Roman Senate granted Augustus the title "Pater Patriae" in 2 BC.

Republican framework

Historic constitution

The constitution of the Roman Republic was a mostly unwritten constitution which developed organically from the Republic's founding in 509 BC. Significant emphasis was placed on custom, the mos maiorum ("ways of the elders"), in the managing of Rome's affairs. The most important institutions within the Republican framework were the Consuls, the Tribunes, the Provincial governors, and the Senate.

Consuls – Two Consuls were elected each year (serving one-year terms) to serve as the chief executives over the Republican government. The Consuls commanded the Republic's military forces, could convene the Senate and lay business before it, could convene any of the Republic's legislative assemblies and lay business before them, and conducted the Republic's foreign relations with other polities. Over time, the Consuls' domestic functions were gradually shifted to other officials (the Praetors assumed the judicial functions and the Aediles assumed the administrative tasks), resulting in the Consuls serving primarily as military figures. Their imperium (military authority) placed all military governors under their command. While their military authority was limited within the city of Rome itself, outside its boundaries their powers were absolute. To prevent corruption in office, each Consul held the power to veto his colleague, with the negative always defeating the affirmative. After a year in office, former Consuls would be assigned by the Senate to serve as a governor (Proconsul) of one of the Republic's provinces.
Tribunes – The office of Tribune was established in the 5th century BC as a method of the plebeians of checking the patrician-dominated government of the day. Following the ending of the Conflict of the Orders, the Tribune represented the interests of the individual citizens against those of the state. Ten Tribunes were elected each year to serve one-year terms, and only Plebeians were allowed to hold the office. The Tribunes' powers were based on the sacrosanctity of his person, which prevented him being arrested and made physical injury to him a capital offense. The Tribunes had the power to convene the Senate and lay business before it, to convene the Plebeian Council and lay business before, to veto the actions of any Republican magistrate or institution, and to inflict summary punishment upon any person who did not recognize his veto. If any magistrate (including either Consul) was threatening to take action against a citizen, the citizen could appeal the magistrate's decision to a Tribune for review. The Tribune's powers, however, were only valid within the city of Rome itself.
Provincial governors – The governors were the chief administrator of the Republic's many provinces. The governor's chief duties included collecting taxes, hearing cases and administering justice, and ensuring security as a military commander. The Senate would select governors by extending the terms of ex-magistrates and a determine their provinces through their advice. Though nominally subject to the higher authority of the reigning Consuls and to the direction of the Senate, the governors, in practice, were largely autonomous.
Senate – The Senate was a body of 300 members (each serving a life term), which served as the main deliberative body of the Republic. The Senate passed decrees called senatus consulta, which constituted "advice" from the Senate to a magistrate or legislative assembly on a particular course of action. While the Senate's advice did not hold legal force, by custom they were usually obeyed. Through its advice, the Senate directed the magistrates, especially the Consuls in their conduct of military conflicts and foreign affairs. The Senate also had an enormous degree of power over the civilian government in Rome itself. The Senate managed the Republic's finances as only it could authorize the disbursal of public fund from the treasury or impose taxes. The Senate also supervised the administration of the provinces, with Senators serving as provincial governors upon assignment by the Senate.

Sulla's reforms

In 82 BC, the general Lucius Cornelius Sulla marched on Rome and assumed control over the Republic's government. Sulla was appointed "Dictator for Writing the Constitution and Laws of the Republic" (dictator legibus faciendis et rei publicae constituendae causa) by the Senate, an emergency official dating from the early years of the Republic. As a Dictator, Sulla was the Republic's supreme military and civil official. In particular, the Senate granted Sulla the power to reorganize the Republic's constitution. Unlike the traditional dictatorial office which held office for six months, Sulla's term was for an unlimited term.

Sulla, a wealthy aristocrat himself, was naturally conservative and reactionary. As such, he sought to strengthen the aristocracy against the masses, in particular the powers of the Senate. Sulla required senatorial approval before any bill could be submitted to the Plebeian Council (which had developed into the Republic's principal legislative assembly). Sulla also reduced the power of the Tribunes. Through his reforms to the Plebeian Council, the Tribunes effectively lost the power to initiate legislation. Sulla then prohibited ex-Tribunes from ever holding any other office, so ambitious individuals would no longer seek election to the Tribunate, since such an election would end their political career. Finally, Sulla revoked the power of the Tribunes to veto acts of the Senate.

Sulla then weakened the independence and prestige of the various magisterial offices by increasing the number of magistrates who were elected each year, and required that all newly elected Quaestors be given automatic membership in the Senate. These two reforms allowed Sulla to increase the size of the Senate from 300 to 600 members. This removed the need for the Censor to draw up a list of senators, since there were always more than enough former magistrates to fill the senate. The Censorship was the most prestigious of all magisterial offices, and by reducing the power of the Censors, this particular reform further helped to reduce the prestige of all magisterial offices. In addition, by increasing the number of magistrates, the prestige of each magistrate was reduced, and the potential for obstruction within each magisterial college was maximized. To prevent obstruction, the various magistrates looked to the Senate for advice and guidance. This increased the importance of the Senate as the principal organ of the Republican government.

To further solidify the prestige and authority of the Senate, Sulla codified the cursus honorum, which required an individual to reach a certain age and level of experience before running for any particular office. In this past, the cursus honorum had been observed through custom but had never actually been a legal requirement. By requiring Senators to be more experienced than they had been in the past, he hoped to add to the prestige, and thus the authority, of the Senate as a body.

Sulla also wanted to reduce the risk that a future general might attempt to seize power as he himself had done. To reduce this risk, he reaffirmed the requirement that any individual wait for ten years before being reelected to any office. Sulla then established a system where all Consuls and Praetors served in Rome during their year in office, and then commanded a provincial army as a governor for the year after they left office. These two reforms were meant to ensure that no governor would be able to command the same army for an extended period of time so as to minimize the threat that another general might attempt to march on Rome.

With his reforms enacted, Sulla resigned as Dictator and retired to private life in 79 BC, dying the next year in 78 BC. Without his continued presence in Rome, Sulla's reforms were soon undone. Gnaeus Pompey Magnus and Marcus Licinius Crassus, two of Sulla's former lieutenants, were elected Consuls for the year 70 BC and quickly dismantled most of Sulla's constitution. While the Senate continued to be the primary organ of the Republican government with the magistrates subservient to its will, the Tribunes regained the powers Sulla had stripped from the office.

Caesar's reforms

Julius Caesar campaigned in Gaul from 59 BC to 49 BC, which granted him unmatched military power and popularity with the people of Rome. With the Gallic Wars concluded, the Senate ordered Caesar to lay down his military command and return to Rome as a privatus ("private citizen"). Caesar refused, and marked his defiance in 49 BC by crossing the Rubicon River at the head of his army, leaving his province and illegally entering Roman territory under arms. Civil war resulted, from which Caesar emerged as the unrivaled ruler of Rome.

With the legitimate government of the Republic defeated, Caesar set about initiating his own constitutional reforms. Caesar immediately set about consolidating the various offices of the Republic into himself. He was first appointed dictator in 49 BC but resigned it within eleven days. In 48 BC, he was re-appointed dictator, only this time for an indefinite period, and in 46 BC, he was appointed dictator for ten years. Finally, in 44 BC, Caesar was appointed dictator for life. In addition to holding the dictatorship, Caesar held the Consulship in 48 BC, 46 BC, 45 BC (without colleague), and 44 BC. By holding the dictatorship and the consulship simultaneously, Caesar's imperium ("military authority") was supreme and all provincial governors were subservient to his will. With his unchallengeable command authority, Caesar could remove any civil magistrate or military commander from office at his pleasure.

In 48 BC, Caesar was granted tribunicia potestas ("Tribunician Powers") for life, which granted him all the powers of a Tribune without actually holding the office itself. His person was made sacrosanct, he was allowed to convene the Senate and lay business before it (including vetoing any of its actions), he was allowed to veto the actions of any magistrate (including exercising summary execution against those who disobeyed him), and he could convene the Plebeian Council and lay legislation before it. Significantly, his holding of tribunal power without actually holding the office allowed Caesar to veto the Tribunes without being vetoed by them in return. Caesar thus dominated the Plebeian Council, preventing the election of Tribunes who might oppose him. On at least one occasion, a Tribune attempted to obstruct him. The offending tribunes in this case were brought before the Senate and divested of their office. After the impeachment, Caesar faced no further opposition from other members of the Tribunician College.

In 46 BC, Caesar gave himself the title of Praefectura Morum ("Prefect of the Morals"). While the office itself was a new institution, its powers were identical to those of the Republican Censorship. Thus, he held the powers of the Censors without subjecting himself to the checks the ordinary Censors were subject to. The ranks of the Senate had been severely depleted due to Caesar's civil war, and so Caesar used his Censorial powers to appoint many new Senators, swelling the Senate's membership to 900. All of these appointments were of his own partisans, which robbed the Senatorial aristocracy of its prestige, and made the Senate increasingly subservient to him.

While the legislative assemblies continued to meet, all candidates for election required his approval and all bills submitted to the assemblies for enactment required his approval. This caused the assemblies to become effectively powerless and unable to oppose Caesar or operate outside his direction. Caesar then increased the number of magistrates who were elected each year, which created a large pool of experienced magistrates, and allowed Caesar to reward his supporters. This also weakened the powers of the individual magistrates, and thus of the magisterial colleges as a whole. To minimize the risk that another general might attempt to challenge him, Caesar passed a law which subjected governors to term limits of no more than two years in office. As Caesar began to prepare for a war against the Parthian Empire in 44 BC, he passed a law which allowed him to appoint all magistrates in 43 BC, and all Consuls and Tribunes in 42 BC. This transformed the various magistrates from being representatives of the people to being agents of Caesar.

Caesar was assassinated on the Ides of March 44 BC. The motives of the conspirators were both personal, as well as political. Most of the conspirators were Senators and many were angry that Caesar had deprived the Senate of much of its power and prestige. There were also rumors that Caesar was going to proclaim himself king. With Caesar's death, the various powers and authority he had assumed lapsed and many of his constitutional reforms were undone.

Second Triumvirate

Following Julius Caesar's assassination, his adoptive son Caesar Octavian and former generals Mark Antony and Marcus Aemilius Lepidus united in 43 BC to defeat the assassins of Caesar and to assume power over the Republic. The Triumvirate was legally established as the Triumviri Rei Publicae Constituendae Consulari Potestate ("Board of Three Men with Consular Power for Restoring the Republic") with the enactment of the Lex Titia.

The Triumvirate was granted power to rule the Republic for five years and was, in effect, a three-man dictatorship. The Triumvirs adopted the positive collegiality principles but not the negative ones. All three Triumvirs were vested with the full power of office but did not possess the ability to veto the others. Much like Caesar's dictatorship, the Triumvirs were granted imperium superior to all civilian magistrates and provincial governors subservient to their will. Their supreme military authority allowed the Triumvirs to remove any civil magistrate or military commander from office at their pleasure. Like Caesar before them, the Triumvirs held the authority to name all magistrates and to punish (without trial) those who disobeyed their commands.

After the Battle of Philippi in 42 BC, the Triumvirs entered an arrangement to divide the Republic's territory between themselves. Octavian received the provinces of Gaul, Hispania, and Italia. Antony received Greece, Asia, and the Republic's eastern client kingdoms (including Egypt under Queen Cleopatra VII). Lepidus, the clear junior partner in the Triumvirate, was left with the province of Africa. The Triumvirate's powers were extended for another five-year period beginning in 37 BC. In 36 BC, Octavian and Lepidus launched a joint operation against the rebel Sextus Pompey, who ruled Sicily. Despite initial setbacks, Sextus' fleet was almost entirely destroyed by Octavian's general Marcus Vipsanius Agrippa at the naval battle of Naulochus. Both Lepidus and Octavian gathered the surrendered troops, yet Lepidus felt empowered enough to claim Sicily for himself and ordered Octavian to withdraw. Lepidus' troops deserted him, however, and defected to Octavian since they were weary of fighting and found Octavian's promises of money to be enticing. Lepidus surrendered to Octavian and was ejected from the Triumvirate, but was allowed to retain his position of Pontifex Maximus. Government of the Republic was now divided between Octavian in the West and Antony in the East. Though the Triumvirate officially expired at the end of 33 BC, both men continued to govern their respective halves.

Despite having married Octavia, Octavian's sister, Antony openly lived in Alexandria with Queen Cleopatra of Egypt, even siring children with her. By using anti-Egyptian propaganda, Octavian turned public opinion against his colleague. Octavian illegally obtained Antony's will in July 32 BC and exposed it to the Roman public: it promised substantial legacies to Antony's children by Cleopatra, and left instructions for shipping his body to Alexandria for burial. Rome was outraged, and the Senate declared war against Cleopatra, an important distinction, because Octavian did not want the Roman people to consider it a civil war. Octavian's forces decisively defeated those of Antony and Cleopatra at the Battle of Actium in Greece in September 31 BC, chasing them to Egypt in 30 BC. Both Antony and Cleopatra committed suicide in Alexandria, and Octavian personally took control of Egypt and Alexandria.

The complete defeat of Antony and the marginalization of Lepidus allowed Octavian to become the sole master of the Roman world.

Transformation into Empire

First settlement

Eschewing the open anti-elitism exhibited by Julius Caesar and Mark Anthony, Augustus modified the political system in this settlement, making it palatable to the senatorial classes of Rome.

In 28 BC Augustus invalidated the emergency powers of the civil war era and in the following year and announced that he was returning all his powers and provinces to the Senate and the Roman people. After senatorial uproar at this prospect, Augustus, feigning reluctance, accepted a ten-year responsibility for the "disordered provinces". As a result, Augustus maintained his imperium over the provinces where the great majority of Rome's soldiery were stationed.

The second part of the settlement involved a change of title. Firstly, he would become princeps. Roughly translating as "first in order", this title traditionally meant leader of the Senate and assured the right to speak first in meetings. The title lent plausibility to his claim to be the restorer of republican institutions vitiated during the civil wars, and as Oxford historian Craig Walsh notes in his seminal work Classics in Room 39: "Princeps was pretty much the same idea as the latin Primus Inter pares" ("First among equals").

On the motion of L. Munatius Plancus, he was also given the honorific cognomen Augustus, which made his full name Imperator Caesar divi filius Augustus. Imperator stressed military power and victory, emphasising his role as commander-in-chief. Divi filius, translating as ‘son of the divine’, showed that whilst he himself didn't have a "god complex" and wasn't an autocrat, he was on the shoulders of the gods, enhancing his legitimacy. Caesar forged a connection to the deified Julius, illustrating where he got his authority. This would have gone down well with Rome's urban poor. Lastly, Augustus was a stamp of religious authority. Meaning "the illustrious" or "the majestic", it associated the ruler with Rome's traditions, gave him extra-constitutional status, served as a demarcation from "Octavian's reign of terror", and was not too suggestive of autocracy like rex.

The first settlement put him in an ideal political position. As summed up by the Res Gestae:

Second settlement

The second settlement was announced in 23 BC, in the wake of Augustus' ill health. Aware that his holding of the consulship inhibited his powers of patronage and may have created resentment among Rome's rising political stars (he had maintained the powerful leadership position for the last ten years), Augustus gave up the position of consul completely. However, where power was concerned, the compensation he received was more than adequate:

 Whilst not literally being a consul, he maintained the right to a seat on the consuls' platform at the front of the Curia.
 He was awarded ius primae relationis, the right to speak first in a Senate meeting.
 He was assured the right to summon a meeting of the Senate, a useful tool for policy-making and upholding the res publica illusion.

Instead of relying on the powers of the consulship which he gave up, he instead relied on the tribunicia potestas, or tribunician power, which enabled him to:

 propose laws to the Senate whenever he wanted.  
 veto any laws he wanted.
 grant amnesty to any citizen accused of crime.

Whilst effectively giving Augustus legislative supremacy, the honour of tribunician power had popular connotations, harking back to the traditions of the republic, and was thus not offensive to the aristocracy. As well as leader of the Senate, Augustus was now guardian of the freedom and welfare of the Roman people.

Beyond Rome, Augustus was granted a form of greater proconsular imperium. Along with governing his own provinces and armies, this position meant that he could effectively override the orders of any other provincial governor in the Roman Empire, which, as the Edicts of Cyrene indicate, he was quite prepared to do.

Normally during republican times, the powers Augustus held even after the Second Settlement would have been split between several people, who would each exercise them with the assistance of a colleague and for a specific period of time. Augustus held them all at once by himself, and with no time limits; even those that nominally had time limits were automatically renewed whenever they lapsed.

Additional powers 
These reforms also meant that credit was given to Augustus for each subsequent Roman military victory after this time, because the majority of Rome's armies were stationed in imperial provinces commanded by Augustus through the legatus who were deputies of the princeps in the provinces. Moreover, if a battle was fought in a senatorial province, Augustus's proconsular imperium maius allowed him to take command of (or credit for) any major military victory. This meant that Augustus was the only individual able to receive a triumph, a tradition that began with Romulus, Rome's first King and first triumphant general. Lucius Cornelius Balbus was the last man outside Augustus's family to receive this award, in 19 BC. Tiberius, Augustus's eldest stepson by Livia, was the only other general to receive a triumph for victories in Germania in 7 BC.

In 19 BC, the Senate granted Augustus a form of general consular imperium, which was probably imperium consulare maius, like the proconsular powers that he received in 23 BC. Like his tribune authority, the consular powers were another instance of gaining power from offices that he did not actually hold. In addition, Augustus was allowed to wear the consul's insignia in public and before the Senate, as well as to sit in the symbolic chair between the two consuls and hold the fasces, an emblem of consular authority. 

On 6 March 12 BC, after the death of Lepidus, he additionally took up the position of pontifex maximus, the high priest of the College of Pontiffs, the most important position in Roman religion. On 5 February 2 BC, Augustus was also given the title pater patriae, or "father of the country".

See also
History of the Constitution of the Roman Republic
Constitution of the Roman Kingdom
Constitution of the Roman Empire
Constitution of the Late Roman Empire

Notes

References

 
 
 
 
 
 
 
 

1st century BC in law
1st century BC in the Roman Republic
Augustus
 
Reform in the Roman Republic